Parthasarathi Mukherjee is an Indian banker and the former MD & CEO of Lakshmi Vilas Bank, headquartered in Chennai, India. He took on this position in December 2015 and resigned as of September 2019. Overall, he has over 30 years of experience in the Indian Banking Industry.

Early life 
Born to an army officer and a housewife in Jalandhar, Punjab, he grew up in Kolkata, West Bengal where he completed his schooling from La Martiniere and went on to receive his bachelor's degree in Chemistry from the Presidency College, University of Calcutta in 1979. After graduating, he cleared the Combined Defence Services exam as he wanted to follow in the footsteps of his father. But he could not make it due to personal reasons and while preparing for the IAS, an opportunity from the State Bank of India presented itself and there was no looking back from that.

Career 
He joined State Bank of India as a Probationary Officer in 1982. Began at an Agricultural branch and then at the bank’s forex trading rooms at Calcutta and New York. The New York stint also coincided with the country’s balance of payments crisis, where SBI’s New York Branch played a pivotal role in managing the country’s precarious forex position.

After making up his mind to move out of the stifling culture of government-owned banks, he jumped at the first opportunity to move to the private sector. He was among the first few people who joined and built Axis Bank (then UTI Bank Ltd). He was involved in setting up the Treasury Operations of the UTI/Axis bank from its inception. Between 1994 and 2008, he honed his treasury skills and headed the Treasury and International Banking Business before taking charge as the Group Executive, Corporate Relationships and International Business in Axis Bank.

In December 2015, he chose to quit his position at Axis Bank and decided to take the plunge to be the top gun in a smaller establishment as the MD & CEO of Lakshmi Vilas Bank. His move has brought in a series of positive news for the bank. For the first time since its inception in 1926, the bank sold shares in a private placement to institutional investors which included Axis Bank, IDBI Bank, Aviva Life Insurance and DHFL Pramerica Life. And the faith that the market has shown is reflected in its stock gaining 50% in a year when the entire industry was shunned by investors due to bad loans. The bank has just raised Rs 168 crore from institutional investors and it is likely to follow up with more share issues as there is a lot of interest from private equity investors. In January 2017, share prices rose as much as 1.1%  The bank has reported a 6.3 per cent rise in net profit at Rs 52.16 crore for the fourth quarter ended March 31.

Personal life 
Mukherjee was married to Papila, and the couple had a daughter Priyadarshini (born 1989). Papila passed away in 2014.
In his free time, Mukherjee likes to read, listen to music and catch up on the latest news in technology.

References 

1960 births
Living people